Ahmadiyya in Palestinian authority refers to a small sect of Islam in the Palestinian-controlled areas of the West Bank and Gaza Strip. The Community, which is not recognized as genuine Islamic by mainstream Muslims, faces persecution and experiences matrimonial restrictions imposed by local Sharia courts. Although no estimates are available, reports suggest that there may be "dozens" of Palestinian Ahmadi Muslims in the West Bank.

History
The Ahmadiyya Muslim Community in Palestine shares its earliest history with the history of the Ahmadiyya Muslim Community in Israel, when the second caliph of the Community, Mirza Basheer-ud-Din Mahmood Ahmad toured the Middle East in 1924 and visited Jerusalem, in what was then the British Mandate of Palestine. The first converts to the movement belonged to the Odeh tribe who originated from Ni'lin a small village, north-west of Jerusalem. In the 1950s, after the establishment of Israel, many Palestinian Ahmadis left Ni'lin and settled in Haifa, Israel.

Modern status

West Bank
The Community is distributed all over the West Bank and is present in the majority of the Governorates. According to the President of the Ahmadiyya Muslim Community in Israel, there is a "growing trend of West Bank Palestinians joining the Ahmadiyya community." Ahmadiyya teachings have been labelled as apostasy by Palestinian National Authority-appointed clerics, which has left many of its members open to persecution. Although the death penalty is not imposed on the Palestinian Ahmadis in spite of the apostasy laws that call for the death penalty, Ahmadis have been beaten and have had their properties destroyed. Palestinian Authority officials have refused calls to defend the rights of Ahmadi Muslims, saying that their status is in the hands of the courts.

Ahmadi Muslims have reported of cases in which the local Sharia courts have dissolved marriages of several Ahmadi couples, leaving many of them in a legal limbo. In Tulkarem, an Ahmadi couple was branded apostate by a local court who annulled their marriage. Another couple, from the same town, in which only the husband was an Ahmadi, met a similar fate. According to Ahmadi leaders, an Ahmadi Muslim man from Nablus was ordered to divorce his wife and let go of his property.

In February 2014, the Palestinian General Investigation Service in Hebron arrested 3 Ahmadi Muslims when they attempted to obtain permission in order to distribute leaflets related to their faith. Accused of inciting sectarian strife, they were referred to the General Prosecution for investigation. A court issued a decision to extend their detention pending investigation. Within a few days, the Palestinian police in Hebron arrested 8 more Ahmadi Muslims on the grounds of distributing leaflets. They all later appeared before Hebron's Magistrates' court that issued a decision to extend their detention to 15 more days.

Gaza Strip
The Community has presence in major cities across the Gaza Strip, including the city of Gaza, Khan Yunis and Rafah.

See also
 Islam in Palestine

References

Palestine
Islam in the State of Palestine